The Sasanian crowns refers to the crowns used by the monarchs of the Sasanian dynasty of Iran. Each monarch had their own unique crown, and some of them had several.

Many of the later Sasanian crowns were suspended by a chain of gold from the top of an arch in the audience-hall as the ruler's neck could not support the weight of the elaborate crown. The later sources cite that the practice of "hanging crown" was extended to any setting in which the monarch appeared, including their deathbed. A crown was also suspended during the birth of a royal heir. The Byzantines adopted this custom from the Iranian court.

See also 
 Korymbos (headgear)

References 

Iranian National Jewels
Culture of the Sasanian Empire
Crowns (headgear)